Bars may refer to:
Bar (establishment) (plural bars), a retail establishment that serves alcoholic beverages
Bar (disambiguation), plural form of various other things
Dessert bar, a confection that has the texture of a firm cake or soft cookie
Parallel bars, apparatus in men's gymnastics
Uneven bars, apparatus in women's gymnastics

Places
Bars, Dordogne, a commune of the Dordogne département in France
Bars, Gers, a commune of the Gers département in France
Bars, Iran, a village in Chaharmahal and Bakhtiari Province, Iran
Bars, Punjab, an area in Punjab, Pakistan
Bars County, a former Kingdom of Hungary county in present-day Slovakia

People
 Hugues Le Bars, a 20th-century French musical composer
 Joseph Barss, a 19th-century American privateer  
 Bars Bek, an 8th-century kagan of Central Asia

Other uses
Bars (hunting rifle), Soviet and Russian hunting rifle
"Bars" (song), by Dallas Smith from the 2020 album Timeless
Bars-class submarine (1915), a group of submarines built for the Imperial Russian Navy
BARS apparatus, a high-pressure high-temperature apparatus usually used for growing or processing minerals, especially diamond
Bars radar, a family of Russian (former USSR) all-weather multimode airborne radars
UAZ Bars, a Russian all-terrain vehicle
Behaviorally anchored rating scales (BARS), used to report performance in psychology research on behaviorism
B.A.R.S., an album by hip-hop artist Cassidy
A variant name for the children's game darebase
 Slang term for alprazolam (Xanax), a tranquilizer
 Bars Kazan, a Russian professional ice hockey team from Kazan

See also
BARS (disambiguation)